Tombstone is a 1993 American Western film directed by George P. Cosmatos, written by Kevin Jarre (who was also the original director, but was replaced early in production), and starring Kurt Russell and Val Kilmer, with Sam Elliott, Bill Paxton, Powers Boothe, Michael Biehn, and Dana Delany in supporting roles, as well as narration by Robert Mitchum.

The film is loosely based on real events that took place in the 1880s in Southeast Arizona, including the Gunfight at the O.K. Corral and the Earp Vendetta Ride. It depicts several Western outlaws and lawmen, such as Wyatt Earp, William Brocius, Johnny Ringo, and Doc Holliday.
Tombstone was released by Hollywood Pictures in theatrical wide release in the United States on December 25, 1993, grossing $73.2 million worldwide. The film was a financial success, and for the Western genre, it ranks number 16 in the list of highest-grossing films since 1979.  Six months later, the similarly themed film Wyatt Earp was released with far less commercial success. Critical reception was generally positive, with the acting, directing, and story receiving praise. Particular praise went towards Val Kilmer's memorable performance as the hard-drinking Doc Holliday, who received various awards and nominations despite not getting an Oscar nomination. The film has become a cult classic since its release.

Plot
In 1879, members of an outlaw gang known to wear red sashes called the Cowboys, led by "Curly Bill" Brocius, ride into a Mexican town and interrupt a local police officer's wedding. They then proceed to massacre the assembled policemen in retribution for killing two of their fellow gang members. Shortly before being shot, a local priest warns them that their acts of murder and savagery will be avenged, referencing the biblical fourth horseman.

Wyatt Earp, a retired peace officer with a notable reputation, reunites with his brothers Virgil and Morgan in Tucson, Arizona, where they venture on toward Tombstone to settle down. There they encounter Wyatt's long-time friend Doc Holliday, who is seeking relief in the dry climate from his worsening tuberculosis. Josephine Marcus and Mr. Fabian are also newly arrived with a traveling theater troupe. Meanwhile, Wyatt's common-law wife, Mattie Blaylock, is becoming dependent on laudanum. Wyatt and his brothers begin to profit from a stake in a gambling emporium and saloon when they have their first encounter with the Cowboys.

As tensions rise, Wyatt is pressured to help rid the town of the Cowboys, though he is no longer a lawman. Curly Bill begins shooting at the sky after a visit to an opium den and is told by Marshal Fred White to relinquish his firearms. Curly Bill instead shoots the marshal dead and is forcibly taken into custody by Wyatt. The arrest infuriates Ike Clanton and the other Cowboys. Curly Bill stands trial but is found not guilty due to a lack of witnesses. Virgil, unable to tolerate lawlessness, becomes the new marshal and imposes a weapons ban within the city limits. This leads to a gunfight at the O.K. Corral, in which Billy Clanton and both of the McLaury brothers are killed. Virgil and Morgan are wounded, and the allegiance of county sheriff Johnny Behan with the Cowboys is made clear. As retribution for the Cowboy deaths, Wyatt's brothers are ambushed; Morgan is killed, while Virgil is left handicapped. A despondent Wyatt and his family leave Tombstone and board a train, with Ike Clanton and Frank Stilwell close behind, preparing to ambush them. Wyatt sees that his family leaves safely, and then surprises the assassins. He kills Stilwell but lets Clanton live to send a message: Wyatt announces that he is a U.S. marshal and that he intends to kill any man he sees wearing a red sash. Wyatt, Doc, a reformed Cowboy named Sherman McMasters, Texas Jack Vermillion, and Turkey Creek Jack Johnson form a posse to seek revenge.

Wyatt and his posse are ambushed in a riverside forest by the Cowboys. Wyatt walks into the creek, miraculously surviving the enemy fire, and kills Curly Bill along with many of his men. Curly Bill's second-in-command, Johnny Ringo, becomes the new head of the Cowboys. When Doc's health worsens, the group is accommodated by Henry Hooker at his ranch. Ringo lures McMasters into the Cowboys' clutches under the pretense of parley and then sends a messenger (dragging McMasters' corpse) to tell Wyatt that he wants a showdown to end the hostilities; Wyatt agrees. Wyatt sets off for the showdown, not knowing that Doc has already arrived at the scene. Doc confronts a surprised Ringo, who was expecting Wyatt, and challenges him to a duel to finish their "game," which Ringo accepts (Doc and Ringo have already had a couple of stand-offs in Tombstone that were ultimately broken up). Wyatt runs when he hears a gunshot, only to encounter Doc, who has killed Ringo. They then press on to complete their task of eliminating the Cowboys, although Clanton escapes their vengeance by renouncing his red sash. Doc is sent to a sanatorium in Colorado, where he dies of his illness. At Doc's urging, Wyatt pursues Josephine to begin a new life.

Cast

Production
The film was shot primarily on location in Arizona. Shooting began in May 1993. The film was supposed to be screenwriter Kevin Jarre's first job as director but he was quickly overwhelmed by the job, failing to get needed shots and falling behind the shooting schedule. A month into filming, he was fired by producer Andrew Vajna and replaced with George P. Cosmatos. Michael Biehn, a close friend of Jarre, considered quitting. Biehn recalled feeling (director) Cosmatos "...had no understanding or appreciation of the screenplay."  By the time of Cosmatos' arrival, though, all actors stayed on board. The new director brought a demanding, hard-nosed sensibility to the set, which led to conflicts with some of the crew members (most famously with cinematographer William Fraker). Meanwhile, Kurt Russell worked quickly with producer James Jacks to pare down Jarre's sprawling script, deleting subplots and emphasizing the relationship between Wyatt and Doc.

Russell has stated that it was he, and not Cosmatos, who directed the film, as Jarre's departure led to the studio's request. Russell stated that Cosmatos was brought in as a "ghost director" as a frontman because Russell did not want it to be known that he was directing. Co-star Val Kilmer has supported Russell's statements about working heavily behind the scenes and stating that Russell "essentially" directed the film, but stopped short of saying that Russell did the actual directing. Biehn stated that Russell never directed him personally.

Cosmatos was highly focused on accurate historical detail, including the costumes, props, customs, and scenery, to give them authenticity. All the mustaches in the movie were real. Val Kilmer practiced for a long time on his quick-draw speed and gave his character a genteel Southern accent. Two locations were used to make the town of Tombstone look bigger. The scene in which Wyatt throws an abusive card dealer (Billy Bob Thornton) out of a saloon was to show that Wyatt was a man who used psychology to intimidate. Thornton's lines in the scene were ad-libbed, as he was only told to "be a bully".

Music

Soundtrack

The original motion picture soundtrack for Tombstone was originally released by Intrada Records on December 25, 1993. On March 16, 2006, an expanded two-disc version of the film score was also released by Intrada Records. The score was composed and produced by Bruce Broughton, and performed by the Sinfonia of London. David Snell conducted most of the score (although Broughton normally conducts his own scores, union problems mandated another conductor here), while Patricia Carlin edited the film's music.

The score contains strong echoes of Max Steiner's music for John Ford's The Searchers (1956) with variations on the 'Indian Traders' theme used midway through the Ford movie. The album begins with the Cinergi logo, composed by Jerry Goldsmith and conducted by Broughton.

Release

Home media
Following its cinematic release in theaters, the film was released on VHS video format on November 11, 1994. The Region 1 Code widescreen edition of the film was released on DVD in the United States on December 2, 1997. Special features for the DVD only include original theatrical trailers. A director's cut of Tombstone was also officially released on DVD on January 15, 2002. The DVD version includes a two-disc set and features "The Making of Tombstone" featurette in three parts; "An Ensemble Cast"; "Making an Authentic Western"; and "The Gunfight at the O.K. Corral". Other features include an audio commentary by director George P. Cosmatos, an interactive Tombstone timeline, the director's original storyboards for the O.K. Corral sequence, the Tombstone "Epitaph" – an actual newspaper account, the DVD-ROM feature "Faro at the Oriental: Game of Chance", and a collectible Tombstone map. This DVD release is also THX certified and features a DTS 5.1 audio track.

The widescreen high-definition Blu-ray Disc edition of the theatrical cut was released on April 27, 2010, featuring the making of Tombstone, director's original storyboards, trailers, and TV spots. A supplemental viewing option for the film in the media format of video-on-demand is available, as well.

Reception

Box office
Tombstone premiered in movie theaters six months before Lawrence Kasdan's Wyatt Earp, on December 24, 1993, in wide release throughout the United States. During its opening weekend, the film opened in third place at the US box office behind The Pelican Brief and Mrs. Doubtfire, grossing $6,454,752 in business showing at 1,504 locations. The film's revenue increased by 35% in its second week of release, earning $8,720,255. For that particular weekend, the film stayed in third place, screening in 1,955 theaters. The film went on to gross $56,505,065 in total ticket sales in the United States and Canada. It ranks 20th out of all films released in 1993. Internationally, it grossed $16.7 million for a worldwide total of $73.2 million.

Critical response
Rotten Tomatoes reported that 72% of 47 sampled critics gave the film a positive review, with an average score of 6.30/10. The site's critical consensus reads, "If you're seeking a stylish modern western with a solid story and a well-chosen ensemble cast, Tombstone is your huckleberry." Following its cinematic release in 1993, Tombstone was named "one of the 5 greatest Westerns ever made" by True West Magazine. The film was also called "One of the year's 10 best!" by KCOP-TV in Los Angeles, California.

Gene Siskel and Roger Ebert of Siskel & Ebert originally thought they would have to miss reviewing the film, as they could not get a screening, but as Ebert explained, "... a strange thing started to happen. People started telling me they really liked Val Kilmer's performance in Tombstone, and I heard this everywhere I went. When you hear this once or twice, it's interesting, when you hear it a couple of dozen times, it's a trend. And when you read that Bill Clinton loved the performance, you figured you better catch up with the movie." Ultimately, Ebert recommended the movie while Siskel did not.

Ebert would later refer to Tombstone in future reviews, comparing it favorably to Kevin Costner's Wyatt Earp ("It forced the comparison upon me.") and, in his review of Wild Bill, singling out Val Kilmer's portrayal as "the definitive saloon cowboy of our time." In his review of Kurt Russell's Dark Blue, he stated, "Every time I see Russell or Val Kilmer in a role, I'm reminded of their Tombstone, which got lost in the year-end holiday shuffle and never got the recognition it deserved."

In a mixed review, Chris Hicks writing in the Deseret News said, "aside from Russell and Val Kilmer's scene-stealing, sickly, alcoholic Doc Holliday, there are so many characters coming and going, with none of them receiving adequate screen time, that it becomes difficult to keep track of them all." But he did comment, "some very entertaining moments here, with Russell spouting memorable tough-guy lines". Overall, he felt, "Taken on its own terms, with some lowered expectations, Western fans will have fun." Emanuel Levy of Variety believed the film was a "tough-talking but soft-hearted tale" which was "entertaining in a sprawling, old-fashioned manner." Regarding screenwriter Jarre's dialogue, he noted, "Despite the lack of emotional center and narrative focus, his script contains enough subplots and colorful characters to enliven the film and ultimately make it a fun, if not totally engaging experience." He also singled out Val Kilmer as the standout performance. The film was not without its detractors. James Berardinelli writing for ReelViews offered a negative review, recalling how he thought, "The first half of Tombstone isn't an example of great filmmaking, but it is engaging. There's a sense of growing inevitability as events build to the shoot-out at the OK Corral. The melodramatic "serious" moments are kept to a minimum, and the various gunfights are choreographed with style and tension. Then, at the one-hour ten-minute mark, the Clanton gang and the Earps square off. From there, things get progressively worse. Not only is the last hour anticlimactic, but it's dull. Too many scenes feature lengthy segments of poorly-scripted dialogue, and, in some cases, character motivation becomes unclear. The gunplay is more repetitious than exciting. The result—a cobbled-together morass of silly lines and shoot-outs—doesn't work well."

Stephen Holden writing in The New York Times saw the film as being a "capacious Western with many modern touches, the Arizona boom town and site of the legendary O.K. Corral has a seedy, vaudevillian grandeur that makes it a direct forerunner of Las Vegas." He expressed his satisfaction with the supporting acting, saying, "[the] most modern psychological touch is its depiction of Josephine (Dana Delany), the itinerant actress with whom Wyatt falls in love at first sight, as the most casually and comfortably liberated woman ever to set foot in 1880s Arizona." Critic Louis Black, writing for The Austin Chronicle, viewed Tombstone as a "mess" and that there were "two or three pre-climaxes but no climax. Its values are capitalist rather than renegade, which is okay if it's metaphoric rather than literal. Worse, as much as these actors heroically struggle to focus the film, the director more successfully hacks it apart." Owen Gleiberman of Entertainment Weekly gave the film a C− rating, calling it "preposterously inflated" at "135 minutes long". He observed the film as being a "three-hour rough cut that's been trimmed down to a slightly shorter rough cut" with "all that holds the film together is Kurt Russell's droll machismo." Author Geoff Andrew of Time Out commented, "Kilmer makes a surprisingly effective and effete Holliday". He negatively acknowledged that there was "a misguided romantic subplot and the ending rather sprawls" but ultimately exclaimed the film was "'rootin', tootin' entertainment with lots of authentic facial hair." Richard Harrington of The Washington Post highlighted the film's shortcomings declaring, "too much of Tombstone rings hollow. In retrospect, not much happens and little that does seems warranted. There are so many unrealized relationships you almost hope for redemption in a longer video version. This one is unsatisfying and unfulfilling." Alternately though, columnist Bob Bloom of the Journal & Courier openly remarked that the film "May not be historically accurate, but offers a lot of punch for the buck." He concluded by saying it was "A tough, guilty-pleasure Western."

Although Val Kilmer’s performance as Doc Holliday was praised, he did not get an Oscar nomination for Best Supporting Actor. He was nominated for Best Male Performance and Most Desirable Male at the MTV Movie Awards.

Books
A paperback novel of the same name adapted from Kevin Jarre's screenplay, written by Giles Tippette and published by Berkley Publishers, was released on January 1, 1994. The book dramatizes the real-life events of the gunfight at the O.K. Corral and Earp Vendetta Ride, as depicted in the film. It expands on Western genre ideas in Jarre's screenplay.

The Making of Tombstone, a book about the film, was published in 2018.

References

External links

 
 
 
 
 
 Tombstone at the Movie Review Query Engine
 
 TOMBSTONE, an original screenplay by Kevin Jarre, Fourth draft, March 15, 1993

1993 films
1993 Western (genre) films
1990s biographical films
1990s historical films
Action films based on actual events
American Western (genre) films
American action drama films
American buddy action films
American biographical drama films
American folklore films and television series
American historical films
Biographical films about Wyatt Earp
Cinergi Pictures films
Cultural depictions of Big Nose Kate
Cultural depictions of Doc Holliday
Cultural depictions of Johnny Ringo
Cultural depictions of Wyatt Earp
Drama films based on actual events
Films about brothers
Films about tuberculosis
Films directed by George P. Cosmatos
Films scored by Bruce Broughton
Films set in Tombstone, Arizona
Films set in the 1880s
Films shot in Arizona
Hollywood Pictures films
Revisionist Western (genre) films
1990s English-language films
1990s American films